This electoral calendar 2008 lists the national/federal direct elections held in 2008 in the de jure and de facto sovereign states and their dependent territories. Referendums are included, even though they are not elections. By-elections are not included.

January
 5 January: Georgia, President, NATO membership referendum and election date referendum
 7 January: Marshall Islands, President (by the parliament)
 9 January: Kosovo, President (by the parliament)
 12 January: Republic of China (Taiwan), Parliament and referendum
 15 January: Barbados, Parliament
 17–19 January: Tokelau, Parliament
 19 January: Faroe Islands, Parliament
 20 January: Cuba, Parliament
 20 January: Serbia, President ( round)
 27 January: French Polynesia, Legislative ( Round)
 29 January: Bhutan, National Council

February
 3 February: Serbia, President ( round)
 3 February: Monaco, Parliament
 7 February: Belize, Legislative and referendum
 8 February: Djibouti, Parliament
 8–9 February: Czech Republic, President (indirect)
 15 February: Czech Republic, President (indirect)
 10 February: French Polynesia, Legislative ( Round)
 11 February: Trinidad and Tobago, President (indirect)
 17–19 February: Sahrawi Arab Democratic Republic, Parliament
 17–24 February: Cyprus, President
 18 February: Pakistan, Parliament
 19 February: Armenia, President
 24 February: French Polynesia, President (indirect)
 24 February: Cuba, President (indirect)
 24 February: Switzerland, Referendum
 October 2007 until February 2008: PR China, National People's Congress

March
 2 March: Russia, President
 2 March: Thailand, Senate
 8 March: Malaysia, Parliament
 8 March: Malta, Parliament
 9 March: Spain, Parliament
 9 March: Hungary, Referendum against government reforms
 9/16 March: Mayotte, Legislative
 14 March: Iran, Legislative ( round)
 15 March: PR China, President (indirect)
 22 March: Republic of China (Taiwan), President and UN membership referendum
 24 March: Bhutan, Parliament
 29 March: Zimbabwe, President ( round) and Parliament

April
 6 April: Montenegro, President
 9 April: South Korea, Parliament
 10 April: Nepal, Constituent Assembly
 13–14 April: Italy, Parliament
 20 April: Paraguay, General
 23 April: Guernsey, General
 23–24 April: Tonga, General
 25 April: Iran, Legislative ( round)
 26 April: Nauru, Parliament
 30 April: Tuvalu, Constitutional referendum

May
 4 May: Equatorial Guinea, Parliament
 10 and 24 May: Burma/Myanmar, Constitutional referendum
 11 May: Serbia, Parliament
 16 May: Dominican Republic, President
 17 May: Kuwait, Parliament
 21 May: Georgia, Legislative
 25 May: Lebanon, President (by the parliament)

June
 1 June: Switzerland, Referendum
 1 June: Macedonia, Assembly
 7 June: Niue, Parliament
 12 June: Ireland, Treaty of Lisbon referendum
 22 June: Slovenia, Regionalisation referendum
 27 June: Zimbabwe, President ( round)
 29 June: Mongolia, Legislative

July
 8 July: Grenada, Parliament
 19 July: Nepal, President ( round) (by the parliament)
 21 July: Nepal, President ( round) (by the parliament)
 27 July: Cambodia, Parliament

August
 2 August: Latvia, Constitutional referendum
 5 August: Republic of the Congo, Senate (indirect)
 10 August: Bolivia, Recall referendum
 23 August: Latvia, Pensions law referendum

September
 2 September: Vanuatu, Parliament
 5–6 September: Angola, Legislature
 6 September: Pakistan, President (indirect)
 7 September: Hong Kong, Legislature
 15–18 September: Rwanda, Parliament
 19 September: Swaziland, Parliament
 19 September: Mauritius, President (indirect)
 21 September: Slovenia, Parliament
 21 September: France, Senate (third of the seats) (indirect)
 25 September: South Africa, President (by the parliament)
 28 September: Ecuador, Constitutional referendum
 28 September: Austria, Parliament
 28 September: Belarus, Parliament

October
 8 October: Maldives, President ( Round)
 12 October: Lithuania, Parliament ( Round) and nuclear power referendum
 14 October: Canada, Parliament
 15 October: Azerbaijan, President
 15 October: Jersey, General ( Round) and Central European Time referendum
 17/18 October: Czech Republic, Senate (one third)
 24/25 October: Czech Republic, Senate (one third)

 26 October: Lithuania, Parliament ( Round)
 29 October: Maldives, President ( Round)
 30 October: Zambia, President

November
 4 November: United States, President, House of Representatives, Senate (one third: Class 2 senators), Governor (11)
 4 November: American Samoa, Governor ( Round), Legislative
 4 November: Guam, Legislative
 4 November: Puerto Rico, Governor, Legislative
 4 November: United States Virgin Islands, Legislative
 4 November: Palau, President, Senate and House of Delegates
 8 November: New Zealand, General
 9 November: San Marino, Parliament
 16 November: Guinea-Bissau, Parliament
 18 November: American Samoa, Governor ( Round)
 25 November: Greenland, Self-government referendum
 26 November: Jersey, General ( Round)
 30 November: Romania, Legislative
 30 November: Switzerland, Referendum

December
 7 December: Ghana, President ( Round) and Parliament
 10 December: Switzerland, Federal Council (indirect)
 14 December: Turkmenistan, Parliament ( Round)
 28 December: Ghana, President ( Round)
 28 December: Turkmenistan, Parliament ( Round)
 29 December: Bangladesh, General

 
Political timelines of the 2000s by year